Tillandsia lotteae is a species of flowering plant from the genus Tillandsia. This species is endemic to Bolivia.

References

lotteae
Flora of Bolivia